The Girl on the Train is a 2021 Indian Hindi-language mystery thriller film directed by Ribhu Dasgupta and produced by Reliance Entertainment, based on British author Paula Hawkins's 2015 novel of the same name. The film stars Parineeti Chopra, Avinash Tiwary, Aditi Rao Hydari and Kirti Kulhari and was released worldwide on 26 February 2021 on Netflix.

Premise
The film revolves around Mira Kapoor (Parineeti Chopra), an alcoholic and troubled divorcee who gets embroiled in a big murder investigation.

Plot
The film begins with Nusrat being chased by someone in the forest and Mira is standing at the station. In a flashback it is shown that Mira met her husband Shekhar at a wedding where they fell in love. They both get married and Mira is pregnant. Mira is fighting a case against Jimmy Bhagga where she successfully wins and Jimmy has to go to jail. A few days later she is hit by a car. Mira suffers from anterograde amnesia caused by a car accident. She is also an alcoholic, which doesn’t exactly help the memory loss either. She and Shekhar have separated and Shekhar married someone else.

Obsessed with a seemingly perfect couple she sees from the train window on her commute to London, one drunken night Mira follows the young woman into the forest but doesn’t recall what happens next.

Mira is actually a bit of a badass. The police have a decent amount of circumstantial evidence against her and even move to make an arrest but Mira escapes out the window and calls in a favour from the family member of a former client. Get me a phone, cash, and a gun, she says.

Mira discovers that the missing girl Nusrat wasn’t as happily married as she looked and that she was having an affair.  It’s entirely plausible that Mira is the killer – in a drunken rage which she accidentally records on her phone, Mira fantasizes about smashing Nusrat’s head in, angry that she is ruining her own marriage.

There are plenty of other suspects too, though, including Nusrat’s sex pest dance teacher, a blackmailing private eye, and more than one aggressive and abusive husband.

In the story, we learn that Mira’s philandering ex-husband Shehkar has been gaslighting her for years. She’s a blackout drunk but she isn’t the violent, offensive brute that he’s been claiming, and she isn’t responsible for him losing his job. 
Though Nusrat was unhappy in her marriage to abusive Anand and was pregnant by someone else, Anand didn’t kill her. Nor did the kindly therapist who was trying to help Nusrat. It turns out the Nusrat’s baby was Shehkar’s, and the night Mira followed Nusrat into “Greenwich Forest” Shehkar was there too and it was him who bashed Mira over the head with a rock and left her there. Nusrat told him of the pregnancy, they fought, and Shehkar strangled Nusrat, leaving her for dead.

But, she wasn’t dead, and here’s where the film diverts. It turns out there were two other people in Greenwich Forest that night. These are the police woman in charge of the case, Inspector Dalbir, and a private detective named Walter, who was hired by Anand to follow Nusrat.

Walter’s pictures from the night reveal that, unbelievably, Dalbir killed Nusrat. The daughter of an organized crime boss Mira had sent down and who had killed himself in jail(Jimmy Bhagga), Dalbir had a vendetta against Mira. It was she who crashed the jeep into Mira and Shekhar, causing Mira to lose her baby and get amnesia. It’s Dalbir who later mows down and kills Walter.

Dalbir had been tailing Mira for a time, and followed her into the forest. Finding her unconscious having been hit by Shekhar, Dalbir saw an opportunity to murder her in revenge. But Nusrat, who had just woken up, caught Dalbir trying to off Mira. Dalbir can’t leave a witness, so instead she decides to kill Nusrat and frame Mira for the murder.

Following the trail to Walter’s house, Mira solves the crime, and when Dalbir turns up to kill her and destroy the evidence ,a fight ensues and badass Mira ends up shooting Dalbir.

Then there’s a musical montage, a voiceover about a train where Mira decides to quit alcohol and begin a new life.

Cast 
 Parineeti Chopra as Mira Kapoor
 Aditi Rao Hydari as Nusrat John Joshi
 Kirti Kulhari as Inspector Dalbir Kaur Bagga
 Avinash Tiwary as Dr. Shekhar Kapoor, Mira's ex-husband 
 Tota Roy Chowdhury as Dr. Hamid, the psychiatrist 
 Suresh Sippy (Mira's Doctor)
 Nisha Aaliya as Piya, Mira's friend 
 Sharik Khan as Wasim, Piya's friend
 Diljohn Singh as Rajiv 
 Shamaun Ahmed as Anand Joshi, Nusrat's husband 
 Monisha Hassen as Zehra, Shekhar's boss
 Vaunisha Kapoor as Party Guest 
 Nina Kumar as Zehra's friend
 Krishan Tandon as Jimmy Bagga, Dalbir's father
 Persephone Hulewicz as Pri
 Vishakh Vadgama as Officer Kunal 
 Natasha Benton as Anjali Kapoor, Shekhar's second wife
 Richie Lawrie as Walter
 Matthew Park as actor

Production 
The film was announced on 24 April 2019. In May 2019 it was revealed that first schedule will be in England. Kirti Kulhari was roped in to play a British cop.

Principal photography began in early August 2019 in London.  Railway scenes were shot on location on the Mid-Norfolk Railway.

Release 
The Girl on the Train was scheduled for release on 8 May 2020. The release was delayed due to COVID-19 pandemic. The film was released on 26 February 2021 on Netflix.

Soundtrack 

The film's music was composed by Sunny and Inder Bawra and Vipin Patwa while lyrics written by Kumaar.

Reception 
The film received mixed reviews from critics. 

Umesh Punwani of Koimoi rated it 3.5 out of 5 stars, calling it  "A Mysterious Journey With No Stops Led By A Deadly Kohl-Eyed Parineeti Chopra!". Bollywood Hungama rated it 2.5/5 stars saying "The Girl On the Train is an average fare". 
Saibal Chatterjee of NDTV gave 1.5 out of 5 stars. Anna M. M. Vetticad of Firstpost rated 2 out of 5 praising Parineeti Chopra 's sincere performance and saying rest of the cast a mixed bag. The Times of India rated the film 3 stars out of 5 praising Chopra's and Kulhari's performances

Accolades

References

External links 

2021 films
2021 thriller films
2020s mystery thriller films
Films about alcoholism
Films about dysfunctional families
Films scored by Vipin Patwa
Films based on adaptations
Films based on British novels
Films based on crime novels
Films based on thriller novels
Films not released in theaters due to the COVID-19 pandemic
Films postponed due to the COVID-19 pandemic
Films set on trains
Films shot in England
Hindi remakes of English films
2020s Hindi-language films
Hindi-language Netflix original films
Indian direct-to-video films
Indian mystery thriller films
Indian pregnancy films
Indian remakes of American films
Reliance Entertainment films
2020s pregnancy films
Films directed by Ribhu Dasgupta